New Albany Township is one of five townships in Floyd County, Indiana. As of the 2010 census, its population was 49,252 and it contained 22,226 housing units.

Geography
Bills Lakes is in this township.

Cities and towns
 New Albany

Unincorporated towns
 Blackiston Mill
 Capperas Banks (extinct)
 Graysville
 Saint Joseph
 Silver Hills
(This list is based on USGS data and may include former settlements.)

Adjacent townships
 Carr Township, Clark County (north)
 Silver Creek Township, Clark County (northeast)
 Jeffersonville Township, Clark County (east)
 Franklin Township (southwest)
 Georgetown Township (west)
 Lafayette Township (northwest)

Major highways
 Interstate 64
 Interstate 265
 U.S. Route 460
 Indiana State Road 62
 Indiana State Road 111
 Indiana State Road 311

Cemeteries
The township contains six cemeteries: Fairview, Graceland, Holy Trinity, New Albany National, Saint Marys and West Haven.

References
 United States Census Bureau cartographic boundary files
 U.S. Board on Geographic Names

External links
 Indiana Township Association
 United Township Association of Indiana

Townships in Floyd County, Indiana
Townships in Indiana